"Wouldn't It Be Loverly" is a popular song by Alan Jay Lerner and Frederick Loewe, written for the 1956 Broadway play My Fair Lady.

The song is sung by Cockney flower girl Eliza Doolittle and her street friends. It expresses Eliza's wish for a better life. In addition to pronouncing "lovely" as "loverly", the song lyrics highlight other facets of the Cockney accent that Professor Henry Higgins wants to refine away as part of his social experiment.

In the stage version it was sung by Julie Andrews. In the 1964 film version, Marni Nixon dubbed the song for Audrey Hepburn. Both Andrews' and Nixon's versions are available on the original cast and soundtrack albums, respectively, and Hepburn's original version is available in the specials for the DVD of the film.

Andy Williams released a version of the song on his 1964 album, The Great Songs from "My Fair Lady" and Other Broadway Hits.

In the late 1980s and early 1990s the song was used in television advertisements for Commonwealth Bank of Australia home mortgages.

Covers and parodies
On the children's show Sesame Street episode 3119, Oscar the Grouch meets a British Grouch named Prunella (a Grouch performed by Louise Gold), who expresses desire to go to the "perfect Grouch place", which doesn't exist, but she has imagined it several times. During the course of this fantasy, she sings "Wouldn't It Be Yucky", which parodies "Wouldn't It Be Loverly".
Peter Sellers included a comic version on his best selling album Songs for Swinging Sellers released in 1959.

References

External links 
 , Julie Andrews on The Ed Sullivan Show on March 19, 1961
 , 2001 London revival

1956 songs
Songs with music by Frederick Loewe
Songs with lyrics by Alan Jay Lerner
Andy Williams songs
Songs from My Fair Lady